Selezni is a rural locality (a village) in Klyapovskoye Rural Settlement, Beryozovsky District, Perm Krai, Russia. The population was 9 as of 2010.

Geography 
Selezni is located 15 km east of  Beryozovka (the district's administrative centre) by road. Galashino is the nearest rural locality.

References 

Rural localities in Beryozovsky District, Perm Krai